Shrove Monday, sometimes known as Collopy Monday, Rose Monday, Merry Monday or Hall Monday, is a Christian observance falling on the Monday before Ash Wednesday every year. A part of the English traditional Shrovetide celebrations of the week before Lent, the Monday precedes Shrove Tuesday. As the Monday before Ash Wednesday, it is part of diverse Carnival celebrations which take place in many parts of the Christian world, from Greece, to Germany, to the Mardi Gras and Carnival of the Americas.

Shrovetide

The word shrove is the past tense of the English verb shrive, which means to obtain absolution for one's sins by way of confession and forgiveness. Thus Shrovetide gets its name from the shriving that English Christians were expected to do prior to receiving absolution immediately before Lent begins. Shrove Tuesday is the last day of "shrovetide", somewhat analogous to the Carnival tradition that developed separately in countries of Latin Europe. The terms "Shrove Monday" and "Shrove Tuesday" are no longer widely used in the United States or Canada outside of liturgical traditions, such as in the Lutheran, Anglican, and Roman Catholic Churches.

Collopy Monday
The British name Collopy Monday is after the traditional dish of the day, consisting of slices of leftover meat (collops of bacon) along with eggs. It is eaten for breakfast and is part of the traditional Lenten preparations. In addition to providing a little meat, the collops were also the source of the fat for the following day's pancakes. It is rarely celebrated these days. 

In east Cornwall, it is sometimes called Peasen Monday or Paisen Monday after the custom of eating pea soup on that day.

German carnivals

Shrove Monday is part of the German, Danish, and Austrian Carnival calendar, called Rosenmontag. In the Rhineland, as part of the pre-lenten Fasching festival (or Feast of Fools), it is part of the parade season, a day of marching, revelry, and satirical floats. In the Carnival in Denmark, it is called fastelavnsmandag.

Eastern Orthodox traditions

In the Eastern Orthodox liturgical calendar (most years falling later than the Western Church, usually in March), the start of (Eastern) Lent is called Clean Monday. This is not identical to Shrove Monday, which precedes the start of (Western) Lent by two days. Clean Monday is the first day of "Great Lent", and is traditionally considered the beginning of spring in Greece and Cyprus, where it is a Bank Holiday. Different traditions take place in different localities.  In the town of Tyrnavos, for instance, feasts are followed by songs and dances with Bacchic overtones.

Caribbean
In the 19th-century Trinidad and Tobago Carnival, a kambule (procession of people holding torches) took place in the earliest hours of Shrove Monday.

Carnival Monday is a national holiday in Aruba, with the purpose of resting after the Carnival.

Lundi Gras
The Shrove Monday events of the New Orleans and Mississippi Gulf Coast Mardi Gras, dating back to the 19th century, have since the late 20th century been named Lundi Gras ("Fat Monday").

See also
Nickanan Night
Fat Thursday

References

Carnivals
Christian festivals and holy days
February observances 
March observances
Monday observances